Shathru is a 1985 Indian Malayalam film,  directed by T. S. Mohan. The film stars Ratheesh, Anuradha, Bheeman Raghu and Kuthiravattam Pappu in the lead roles. The film has musical score by A. T. Ummer.

Cast
Ratheesh as Sudhindran
Anuradha as Savithri Sankar
Bheeman Raghu as Johnny
Kuthiravattam Pappu as Kurup
Madhuri
Unnimary as Cicily
Balan K. Nair as U. P. Menon
Valsala Menon
Mala Aravindan as Thamarakshan/Kottada Vasu
Babu Antony as Man in the crowd
Devan as Rajasekharan
Sathaar as Ramakrishnan
Madhuri as Suma

Soundtrack
The music was composed by A. T. Ummer and the lyrics were written by Poovachal Khader.

References

External links
 

1985 films
1980s Malayalam-language films